Schamp may refer to:

6376 Schamp, a main-belt asteroid
Mathias Schamp (born 1988), a Belgian footballer